Narok West is a constituency in Kenya. It is one of six constituencies in Narok County.

References 

Constituencies in Narok County